John Mccreary (November 4, 1833) was a U.S. Representative from South Carolina.

Biography

Early life
John McCreary was born in approximately 1761 near Fishing Creek Lake, about eighteen miles from Chester in the Province of South Carolina. He received his schooling from private tutors.

Career
He became a surveyor. He also engaged in agricultural pursuits, and he ran a Southern plantation in South Carolina. Later, he served in the Revolutionary War.

He was a member of the South Carolina House of Representatives from 1794 to 1799 and 1802. He was elected as a Democratic-Republican to the Sixteenth Congress, where he served from March 4, 1819, to March 3, 1821.

He resumed agricultural pursuits and surveying.

Death
He died on his plantation in South Carolina on November 4, 1833. He was buried in the Richardson Church Cemetery, Chester County, South Carolina.

Sources

1761 births
1833 deaths
United States military personnel of the American Revolution
Democratic-Republican Party members of the United States House of Representatives from South Carolina